The 2022 Syracuse Orange women's soccer team represented Syracuse University during the 2022 NCAA Division I women's soccer season. The Orange were led by head coach Nicky Adams, in her fourth season.  They played home games at SU Soccer Stadium. This was the team's 26th season playing organized women's college soccer, and their 9th playing in the Atlantic Coast Conference.

The Orange finished the season 8–7–3, 1–6–3 in ACC play to finish thirteenth place. They did not qualify for the ACC Tournament.  They were not invited to the NCAA Tournament.

Previous season 

The Orange finished the season 4–12–1, 0–10–0 in ACC play to finish in fourteenth place. They did not qualify for the ACC Tournament.  They were not invited to the NCAA Tournament.

Offseason

Departures

Incoming Transfers

Recruiting Class

Source:

Squad

Roster

Team management

Source:

Schedule

Source:

|-
!colspan=6 style=""| Exhibition

|-
!colspan=6 style=""| Non-Conference Regular season

|-
!colspan=6 style=""| ACC Regular season

Awards and honors

Rankings

References

Syracuse
Syracuse
2021
Syracuse women's soccer